= Pinturas Superior (Ecuador) =

Pinturas Superior is an Ecuadorian paints brand. Apart from paint, the brand also sells latex, sprays, paint handles and other related products.

Like its Puerto Rican namesake, Pinturas Superior of Ecuador also has a main store and showroom, theirs located at Via J Tanca Marengo, Guayaquil, Guayas Province, Ecuador.

Pinturas Superior was founded during the early 1970s by Vicente Govea Solorzano, an Ecuadorian businessman.
